Domenico Menna (1632 – August, 1691) was a Roman Catholic prelate who served as Bishop of Minori (1683–1691).

Biography
Domenico Menna was born in Naples, Italy in 1632 and ordained a priest on 19 December 1655. On 20 December 1683, he was appointed during the papacy of Pope Innocent XI as Bishop of Minori. On 27 December 1683, he was consecrated bishop by Alessandro Crescenzi (cardinal), Cardinal-Priest of Santa Prisca, with Pier Antonio Capobianco, Bishop Emeritus of Lacedonia, and Costanzo Zani, Bishop of Imola, serving as co-consecrators. He served as Bishop of Minori until his death in August 1691.

References

External links and additional sources
 (for Chronology of Bishops) 
 (for Chronology of Bishops) 

17th-century Italian Roman Catholic bishops
Bishops appointed by Pope Innocent XI
1632 births
1691 deaths